William Theodore Grier (born October 19, 1963) is an American college basketball coach. He is currently an assistant coach at the University of Colorado and was formerly the head men's basketball coach at the University of San Diego.

Early career
Grier was born in Silverton, Oregon, and he attended Cottage Grove High School in Cottage Grove, Oregon. He began coaching freshman basketball at his alma mater in 1986. He left to attend Central Oregon Community College and Southwestern Oregon Community College, where he played basketball, before earning a Bachelor of Science degree from the University of Oregon in 1990.

College coaching career
Grier coached at Creswell High School in Creswell, Oregon before becoming an assistant college coach at Gonzaga University in 1992. He remained at Gonzaga until 2007, when he was hired to coach at USD. In his first season, Grier coached the Toreros to an upset of Gonzaga in the finals of the WCC tournament. The Toreros received a #13 seed in the 2008 NCAA men's basketball tournament and upset #4 seed Connecticut in the first round.

In April 2008, Grier explored the opening at Oregon State but decided to remain at San Diego. On March 16, 2015, the University of San Diego announced they parted ways with Grier.

On August 24, 2015, Grier was announced as an assistant at Oklahoma State University, pending approved by the board of trustees. 

On March 28, 2016, Grier was hired as an assistant coach for the University of Colorado under Buffaloes head coach Tad Boyle.

Head coaching record

References

1963 births
Living people
American men's basketball coaches
American men's basketball players
Basketball coaches from Oregon
Basketball players from Oregon
Gonzaga Bulldogs men's basketball coaches
Junior college men's basketball players in the United States
People from Cottage Grove, Oregon
People from Creswell, Oregon
People from Silverton, Oregon
San Diego Toreros men's basketball coaches
University of Oregon alumni